Pierre Albaladejo (born 14 December 1933 in Dax) is a former French rugby union player. His usual position was at fly-half or at fullback.

He played all his career for Dax, from 1952/53 to 1965/66. 
 
He had 30 caps for France, from 1954 to 1964, scoring 16 conversions, 12 penalties and 12 drop goals, 104 points on aggregate.

He achieved the rank of Officer in France's Legion of Honour.

References

See also

 Legion of Honour
 Legion of Honour Museum 
 List of Legion of Honour recipients by name (A)
 Ribbons of the French military and civil awards

1933 births
Living people
People from Dax, Landes
French rugby union players
France international rugby union players
French people of Spanish descent
US Dax players
Rugby union fly-halves
Rugby union fullbacks
US Dax executives
Officiers of the Légion d'honneur
Sportspeople from Landes (department)